William H. Moser (born November 1954) is an American diplomat who serves as the Director of the Bureau of Overseas Buildings Operations.

Education 

Moser earned a Bachelor of Arts at the University of North Carolina, Chapel Hill and studied at Universitaet zu Koeln in Cologne, Germany.

Career 

He is a career member of the Senior Foreign Service, class of Minister-Counselor. He has served as an American diplomat since 1984. He has served at seven United States Missions overseas, including as United States Ambassador to Moldova from 2011 to 2015, and in senior leadership positions at the United States Department of State.

Ambassadorships

Moldova 

In 2011, President Barack Obama nominated Moser to be the United States Ambassador to Moldova. He served from September 21, 2011, to January 22, 2015.

Kazakhstan 

On August 13, 2018, President Trump nominated Moser to be the United States Ambassador to Kazakhstan. His nomination was confirmed by voice vote in the United States Senate on January 2, 2019. He was sworn in on February 12, 2019. He presented his credentials on February 18, 2019. Moser previously served in Kazakhstan in 1996, in the then-Embassy in Almaty as a management officer and then as energy attaché.

Personal life 

Moser speaks Russian and German.

See also
List of ambassadors of the United States

References

|-

1964 births
Living people
21st-century American diplomats
Ambassadors of the United States to Kazakhstan
Ambassadors of the United States to Moldova
United States Department of State officials
United States Foreign Service personnel
University of North Carolina at Chapel Hill alumni